is a passenger railway station located in the city of Kasukabe, Saitama, Japan, operated by the private railway operator Tōbu Railway. The station is numbered "TD-08".

Lines

Station layout
The station consists of two ground-level opposing side platforms serving two tracks, with an elevated station building above.

Platforms

Adjacent stations

History
Toyoharu Station opened on 17 November 1929.

From 17 March 2012, station numbering was introduced on all Tōbu lines, with Toyoharu Station becoming "TD-08".

Passenger statistics
In fiscal 2019, the station was used by an average of 13,398 passengers daily.

Surrounding area
Kasukabe Toyoharu Post Office

References

External links

 Toyoharu Station information (Tobu) 

Railway stations in Saitama Prefecture
Tobu Noda Line
Stations of Tobu Railway
Railway stations in Japan opened in 1929
Kasukabe, Saitama